The Communist Party of Togo (abbreviated PCT) is a communist party in Togo. It publishes the newspaper Révolution and has a youth wing, the Communist Youth Organisation of Togo (OJCT).

History 
The party was established on 4 May 1980 and originally followed the political line of the Party of Labour of Albania. The PCT evolved out of the Communist Group of Togo (GCT), which was later known as Communist Organisation of Togo (OCT).

References

External links 
 Official website

Political parties established in 1980
Political parties in Togo
Communism in Togo
Togo
Hoxhaist parties
Anti-revisionist organizations
1980 establishments in Togo
International Coordination of Revolutionary Parties and Organizations